Colossians 3 is the third chapter of the Epistle to the Colossians in the New Testament of the Christian Bible.  Traditionally, it is believed to have been written for the churches in Colossae and Laodicea (see ) by Apostle Paul, with Timothy as his co-author, while he was in prison in Ephesus (years 53–54), although there are debatable claims that it is the work of a secondary imitator, or that it was written in Rome (in the early 60s). In the previous chapter, Paul has reminded the people that they no longer "belong to the world", but they are to live in intimate union with Christ, and this chapter contains his advice how he wants the Colossians to live.

Text
The original text was written in Koine Greek. This chapter is divided into 25 verses.

Textual witnesses
Some early manuscripts containing the text of this chapter are:
Papyrus 46 (c. AD 200)
Codex Vaticanus (325–350)
Codex Sinaiticus (330–360)
Codex Alexandrinus (400–440)
Codex Ephraemi Rescriptus (c. 450; complete)
Codex Freerianus (c. 450; extant verses  5–8, 15–17, 25)
Codex Claromontanus (c. 550; in Greek and Latin)
Codex Coislinianus (c. 550; extant verses 1–11)

How the Colossians ought to live (3:1—21)
Verses 1–4 "spell out the consequences of rising with Christ" and lead to an account of how believers "ought to live".

Verse 3
For ye are dead, and your life is hid with Christ in God.
Henry Alford prefers the wording "you died" in place of "you (ye) are dead". The latter "though allowable, is not so good, as merely asserting a state, whereas [you died] recalls the fact of that state having been entered on".

Verse 10
and have put on the new man who is renewed in knowledge according to the image of Him who created him
"The image": In discussing the renewal of the "new humanity", Paul sees Christ – the image of God the creator – as the "paradigm for believers' transformation".

Verse 11
 where there is neither Greek nor Jew, circumcised nor uncircumcised, barbarian, Scythian, slave nor free, but Christ is all and in all.
"Greek and Jew", preceded by "not any", signifies the "whole human race".
This verse parallels Galatians 3:28.
The actual Scythians are not in view; their name stands for people regarded as especially foreign or savage and augments "barbarian".

Verse 16
 Let the word of Christ dwell in you richly in all wisdom, teaching and admonishing one another in psalms and hymns and spiritual songs, singing with grace in your hearts to the Lord.
"The word of Christ" may mean "the word spoken by Christ" ("Christ's message" in the Good News Bible), or "the message about Christ" (the Contemporary English Version), or "about the Messiah" (Holman Christian Standard Bible). Some Greek manuscripts read "God", for example, Codex Alexandrinus, Ephraemi Rescriptus and Minuscule 33, or "Lord", as in Codex Sinaiticus and Codex Freerianus; all others have "Christ".

Verse 17
 And whatever you do in word or deed, do all in the name of the Lord Jesus, giving thanks to God the Father through Him.
 "Whatever you do in word or deed": This includes anything, in preaching the Christ's word, hearing the Gospel, singing psalms, hymns, and spiritual songs, and in conversation with each other; or in any actions, relating to God or man, or one another, in the world or church.
 "Do all in the name of the Lord Jesus": both in the strength of Christ, and according to the will of Christ as declared in the Gospel, calling his name for help in doing every duty, only for his honor and glory.
 "Giving thanks to God, and the Father by him": (cf. ) directed to God, the Father of Lord Jesus Christ, and him alone.

Exhortation to slaves (3:22–25)
As in the Epistle to the Ephesians, the instructions to slaves are longer than to masters, because they concern not only Christian household slaves, but also slaves working outside households (in agriculture or industry, etc.) and slaves of non-Christian masters. A model on the "mutual responsibilities of slaves and masters within the Christian fellowship" can be viewed in the Epistle to Philemon, where the slaves and masters are brothers in Christ. Slaves (or employees in modern days) to non-Christian masters should work more faithfully, because they are above all the servants of Christ, committed to please him, not the masters, or not fear the earthly masters but in reverence for Christ as the heavenly master (verse 23), and therefore linking the quality of their service to the reputation of Christ or Christianity.

Verse 23
 And whatever you do, do it heartily, as to the Lord and not to men.

Verse 24
You know that your real master will give you an inheritance as your reward. It is Christ, your real master, whom you are serving.

Verse 25
anyone who does wrong will be paid his due because He doesn’t play favorites.

See also
 Psalm 119
 John 15
 Ephesians 6

References

Bibliography

External links
 King James Bible - Wikisource
English Translation with Parallel Latin Vulgate
Online Bible at GospelHall.org (ESV, KJV, Darby, American Standard Version, Bible in Basic English)
Multiple bible versions at Bible Gateway (NKJV, NIV, NRSV etc.)

03